A special election was held August 26, 1817 in  to fill a vacancy left by the resignation of Representative-elect James Lloyd (F) before the beginning of the 15th Congress.

Mason was seated December 2, 1816.

Election results

See also
List of special elections to the United States House of Representatives

References

Massachusetts 1817 01
1817 01
Massachusetts 1817 01
Massachusetts 01
United States House of Representatives 01
United States House of Representatives 1817 01